Buena Vista is an unincorporated community in Monroe County, Alabama.  The village of Buena Vista is listed on the Alabama Register of Landmarks and Heritage.  Additionally, it has one other site listed, the 	Concord Baptist Church.

References

Unincorporated communities in Alabama
Unincorporated communities in Monroe County, Alabama